M.R. was a microcar model built in 1945 by Industria Aeronautică Română in Braşov, Romania.

History
Another model, a three-wheeler with an air-cooled engine, as made in 1957. Neither model made it into production.

References

Cars introduced in 1945
Rear-wheel-drive vehicles
Rear-engined vehicles
Cars of Romania